Chen Shuozhen (died 653) was a Tang dynasty woman from Muzhou (in modern Chun'an, Zhejiang), who led a peasant uprising in 653.  During the rebellion, she declared herself Empress Wenjia (文佳皇帝), becoming the first female rebel leader in Chinese history to assume the title of Huangdi (Emperor). Shuozhen rang bells and burnt incense as she marched to war. She was said to have magic powers, and her people said she was a deity.

Biography 
Chen Shuozhen was born from a humble and slave background. She was the sister-in-law of Zhang Shuzeng. In the early years of Tang Gaozong, the Zhejiang area, it went through successive periods of famine. The peasants were living in precarious conditions, due to hunger and also the oppression of the nobles. Because of this, there was an increasing discontent with the feudal lords and the Empire. Chen Shuozhen appears since then, she sympathized with the victims of the famine, robbing the aristocrats to help the people.

In 653 AD, less than four years after the death of Emperor Taizong, a large-scale peasant uprising occurred in Zhejiang during the fourth year of Tang Gaozong's Yonghui era. Chen Shuozhen was the leader of this rebellion, she claimed to return to the world from heaven, and turned into a man. She gathered a large number of believers with enchanting people. In early 653, she started her own army and claimed to be "Emperor Wenjia"; and appointed her brother-in-law (Zhang Shuzeng) as her prime minister. 

Emperor Wenjia led two thousand people to capture Chenzhou and Yuqian County, she also attacked Zhangzhou but failed. After several battles the whole army was wiped out. She was also killed in November of that year, and tens of thousands of people surrendered.

Emperor Wenjia's reign lasted only two months, with the last of her 14,000 troops surrendering in late 653. Her story survives though as she's said to have inspired Fang La's uprising at the end of the Northern Song dynasty and remains prominent in  Zhejiang folklore.

References 

Women leaders of China
653 deaths
7th-century executions by the Tang dynasty
People from Hangzhou
Year of birth unknown
Generals from Zhejiang
Tang dynasty rebels
7th-century women rulers
7th-century Chinese monarchs
Women in war in China
Women in medieval warfare
Chinese female military personnel
Empresses regnant
Self-proclaimed monarchy